The Yarrangobilly River is a perennial river of the Murrumbidgee River catchment within the Murray–Darling basin, located in the Snowy Mountains region of New South Wales, Australia.

Course and features
The river flows generally southwest, before spilling into Talbingo Reservoir at Tobo Hall, formed by the impounding of the Tumut River via Talbingo Dam. The river descends  over its  course.

The Snowy Mountains Highway crosses the river at the locality of Yarrangobilly.

Recreation
One of the main visitor access points to the river is the Yarrangobilly Caves area. Walking tracks along the river include River Walk and Castle Walk which leads to the Yarrangobilly Caves; as well as the Glory Farm track which leads to the remnants of Henry Harris' Glory Hole Farm. Other recreational activities include fishing, canoeing and rafting.

Fauna
The endangered Booroolong Frog was historically recorded in the Yarrangobilly River, but it is believed that the population may have disappeared due to the infectious disease Chytridiomycosis. The introduced rainbow trout is found in the river, a result of the stocking of local water bodies from the Gaden Trout Hatchery at Jindabyne  by the Monaro Acclimatisation Society.

See also

 List of rivers of New South Wales (L-Z)
 List of rivers of Australia
 Rivers of New South Wales

References

Rivers of New South Wales
Snowy Mountains
Murray-Darling basin
Snowy Valleys Council